Anisimov or Anisimoff (from the male personal name Onisim, which later changed into Anisim) is a Russian masculine surname, its feminine counterpart is Anisimova. It may refer to

Alexander Anisimov (born 1947), Russian bass singer and conductor
Alexei Anisimov (ice hockey) (born 1984), Russian professional ice hockey goaltender
Artem Anisimov (ice hockey, born 1976), Russian ice hockey player
Artem Anisimov (born 1988), Russian ice hockey player
Artyom Anisimov (footballer) (born 1991), Russian footballer
Maksim Anisimov (born 1983), Belarusian ski jumper
Mikhail Anisimov (born 1941), Russian and American interdisciplinary scientist
Sergei Anisimov (born 1990), Russian footballer
Valery Anisimov (born 1937), Soviet wrestler
Vasily Anisimov, Russian billionaire businessman
 Vasily Anisimoff (1878–1938), Russian revolutionary-menshevik
 Vladimir Anisimoff (born 1950), Russian composer and physicist
Yevgeny Anisimov, head of Baikonur space center 2010–2014

Amanda Anisimova (born 2001), American tennis player
Domna Anisimova ("Blind Domna"), Russian poet
Natalya Anisimova (born 1960), Russian handball player
Nina Aleksandrovna Anisimova (1909-1979), Russian dancer and choreographer
Nina Valentinovna Anisimova (born 1973), Russian triathlete
Tanya Anisimova (born 1966), Russian cellist
Tatyana Anisimova (born 1949), Soviet hurdler
Vera Anisimova (born 1952), Soviet sprinter

See also
 Anisimoff

References

Russian-language surnames